Bobby Jasoos is a 2014 Indian Hindi-language comedy drama film directed by Samar Shaikh and produced by Dia Mirza and Sahil Sangha. The film stars Vidya Balan  and features Ali Fazal, Arjan Bajwa, Supriya Pathak, Rajendra Gupta and Tanvi Azmi in supporting roles. It tells the story of Bilqees "Bobby" Ahmed, a Hyderabadi woman who aspires to be a detective despite facing a series of obstacles.

Plot 

Living in a middle-class orthodox family of Old Hyderabad, Bilqees Ahmed aka Bobby is a wannabe private detective. She lives with her Abba , Ammi, Kausar Khala and two younger sisters including Noor in Moghalpura area near Charminar.  To pursue her passion of spying, Bobby solves petty neighbourhood cases such as helping Tasawwur, a TV show host, to get rid of marriage proposals brought home by his parents. Bobby finally gets her big break when a rich NRI Anees Khan hands her a case of finding two missing girls named 'Niloufer' and 'Aamna' with a birth mark on their hand and shoulder respectively. To solve the case, Bobby takes up many get-ups such as 'beggar', 'peon', 'hawker', 'nerd student', 'astrologer' and even a fake 'TV producer'. After locating the targets, Khan pays her a tremendous fee and also offers huge amount of money to both girls' fathers for reasons unknown to Bobby. Khan also hands over his third and final case of finding a boy with a missing toe named 'Ali'.

Meanwhile, Bobby and Tasawwur's family fix their marriage leaving both into the dilemma of how to get rid of this situation. A local goon Lala also offers a case to Bobby to break Lala's girlfriend Aafreen (Anupriya Goenka)'s marriage, which is forcefully fixed by her mother Saida. On Bobby's denial, Lala makes her realize that she has been helping the NRI for a wrong cause. Doubting on that Bobby tries to know the whereabouts of the two girls, but gets to know that both girls have gone missing. Scared and shocked, Bobby takes help from Tasawwur and sneaks into Khan's 5 star hotel room to check his background, only to be caught and thrown out by Khan and the hotel staff. But Bobby manages to get a hold of Khan's diary and his old photograph, which later gets into the hands of Lala, who since then starts following Bobby.

Khan now suddenly goes into hiding and Bobby starts searching for him with the belief that Khan will not leave the town without his third target Ali. With the help of clues in Khan's diary such as a London based library's stamp and a Biryani order from a local restaurant, Bobby gets to know about Khan's background and later Khan is shown following Ali. It turns out to be a trap to capture Khan. With the twist in the climax, it is revealed that the three people Khan was looking for were his long lost children during communal riots. Khan has offered money to both girl's foster parents for helping them and sent the girls to London to pursue higher education. Tasawwur also enters the scene along with Lala who is actually Khan's long lost son 'Ali'. The film ends with Bobby becoming a famous detective, while she and Tasawwur are now in love with each other but are still confused about their marriage.

Cast 
 Vidya Balan as Bilqees Ahmed aka Bobby
 Ali Fazal as Tasawwur Sheikh 
 Arjan Bajwa as Lala 
 Kiran Kumar as Anees Khan
 Anupriya Goenka as Aafreen
 Rajendra Gupta as Bilqees' father
 Supriya Pathak as Ammi/ Zebo Ahmed 
 Tanvi Azmi as Kausar Khaala
 Benaf Dadachandji as Noor
 Prasad Barve as Shetty
 Aakash Dahiya as Munna
 Zarina Wahab as Afreen's Ammi/ Saida
 Vinay Varma as Tasawwur's father
 Ankita Roy as Niloufer
 Sangeeta Pamnani as Tasawwur's mother
 Gangadhar Pandey as Haji Kamaal
 Rama Rao Jadhav as suspicious man
 Praveen Goel as Rashid Baig
 Tejas Mahajan as Sohail
 Sundeep Hemnaoni as Arif
 Surbhi Chandna as Aamna Khan/ Aditi
 Sukesh Anand as Sodhi
 Kunjan Luthra as Sunita, Hotel receptionist
 G S Patel as Reddy
 Pushpa as Niloufer's mother
 Raina as Zeenat
 Rashmi Seth as old Bohra woman

Production 
Filming of Bobby Jasoos was postponed by 11 days from the scheduled date due to an emergency heart surgery of Dia Mirza's mother. Mirza later stated that the filming will commence from 25 November 2013. The filming will commence from Hyderabad, the city where the story is based and is supposed to wrap by January 2014. Shooting for the film started on 23 November 2013. The film will be shot in one long schedule of 55 days.

Vidya Balan was cast  in the lead role and Ali Fazal was  signed opposite her.

Soundtrack 

Shantanu Moitra  composed the film score, while lyrics are written by Swanand Kirkire. Singers Shreya Ghoshal and Papon were also reported to record a song for the film. Aishwarya Nigam has also recorded a song. Singer Bonnie Chakraborty said in an interview that he has recorded a duet for the film with Shreya Ghoshal.

References

External links 
 
 
 

2014 films
2014 comedy-drama films
2010s comedy thriller films
Indian comedy-drama films
Indian comedy thriller films
Films set in Hyderabad, India
Films shot in Hyderabad, India
Reliance Entertainment films
2014 comedy films
Indian detective films
Indian films with live action and animation